Tenda dos Milagres can refer to:

 Tenda dos Milagres (novel), a 1969 novel
 Tenda dos Milagres (film), a 1977 film based on the novel